Robert Werner Duemling (February 29, 1929 - July 13, 2012) was an American Career Foreign Service Officer who served as Ambassador Extraordinary and Plenipotentiary to Suriname (1982-1984).

Biography
Duemling grew up in Fort Wayne, Indiana and San Diego, California. He graduated from San Diego High School before continuing on to earn bachelor's and master's degrees in Art and Architecture from Yale University and a Henry Fellowship to study at Cambridge University in England. Before joining the Foreign Service in 1957, he served as a naval officer during the Korean War.  He retired in 1987 to accept the position of President and Director of the National Building Museum in Washington, D.C.

References

Ambassadors of the United States to Suriname
United States Foreign Service personnel
People from Fort Wayne, Indiana
People from San Diego
Yale University alumni
Directors of museums in the United States
1929 births
2012 deaths
Alumni of the University of Cambridge

San Diego High School alumni